Pleading Guilty, published in 1993, is Scott Turow's third novel, and like the previous two it is set in fictional Kindle County.

The novel begins with a middle-aged lawyer, basically waiting to retire, being assigned by his firm to track down another attorney who has embezzled millions from the firm and disappeared.

Many of the minor characters in Pleading Guilty also appear in Turow's other novels, which are all set in fictional, Midwestern Kindle County.

A pilot for a television show based on Pleading Guilty was shot in 2010 but not picked up by the Fox network.

External links 
  (the pilot)

Kindle County
American thriller novels
1993 American novels
Novels by Scott Turow
Farrar, Straus and Giroux books
Novels set in Illinois